Olga Dubeneckienė  (1891–1967) was a Lithuanian and Soviet painter.

See also
List of Lithuanian painters

References
Universal Lithuanian Encyclopedia

1891 births
1967 deaths
20th-century Lithuanian painters
Soviet painters